Ben-Ari is a Hebrew name, meaning "son of a lion". It may refer to:

Eyal Ben-Ari (born 1953), Israeli sociologist
Hanan Ben Ari (born 1988), Israeli singer and musician
Merav Ben-Ari, Israeli politician
Michael Ben-Ari (born 1963), Israeli politician, Knesset member with the National Union party
Miri Ben-Ari (born 1978), Israeli violinist
Mordechai Ben-Ari, Israeli computer scientist
Mosh Ben-Ari (born 1970), Israeli musician
Rafael Ben-Ari (born 1971), Israeli photojournalist
Shmil Ben Ari, Israeli actor
Uri Ben-Ari (disambiguation), several persons

Hebrew-language surnames